The 2015 Moldovan Super Cup was the ninth Moldovan Super Cup, an annual Moldovan football match played by the winner of the national football league (the National Division) and the winner of the national Cup. The match was played between Milsami Orhei, champions of the 2014–15 National Division, and Sheriff Tiraspol, winners of the 2014–15 Moldovan Cup. It was held at the Sheriff Stadium on 25 June 2015.

Sheriff Tiraspol won the match 3–1.

Match

References

2015–16 in Moldovan football
FC Milsami Orhei matches
FC Sheriff Tiraspol matches
Moldovan Super Cup